William Woods (died October 1966) was an Irish politician. He was an independent member of Seanad Éireann from 1956 to 1957. He was elected at a by-election to the 8th Seanad on 14 May 1956, replacing James McGee. He lost his seat at the 1957 Seanad election.

References

Year of birth missing
1966 deaths
Irish farmers
Members of the 8th Seanad
Independent members of Seanad Éireann